The Cannonball Adderley Sextet in New York is a live album by jazz saxophonist Cannonball Adderley recorded at the Village Vanguard and released on the Riverside label featuring performances by Adderley with Nat Adderley, Yusef Lateef, Joe Zawinul, Sam Jones and Louis Hayes.

Reception
The AllMusic review by Richard S. Ginell awarded the album 4 stars, noting: "This was the recording debut of the Adderley Sextet, with Cannonball waxing eloquently and swingingly on alto, brother Nat charging ahead on cornet, and the versatile Yusef Lateef (who had joined the band only three weeks earlier) adding a bit of an edge on tenor, flute, and unusually for a jazz wind player, oboe on the odd, dirge-like 'Syn-Anthesia'. There is plenty of talk from Cannonball as well... This group would be Zawinul's springboard to prominence in the jazz world — and already his compulsively funky mastery of bop and the blues has fused tightly with the Sam Jones/Louis Hayes rhythm section." The Penguin Guide to Jazz awarded the album 2½ stars, stating: "'Bringing in Joe Zawinul and Yusef Lateef energised the band anew." When reissued in 2008, All About Jazz called the album "perhaps the single most indispensable recording by the Adderley Brothers."

Track listing 
 Introduction by Cannonball – 1:54  
 "Gemini" (Jimmy Heath) – 11:46  
 "Planet Earth" (Yusef Lateef) – 7:59  
 "Dizzy's Business" (Ernie Wilkins) – 6:59  
 "Syn-Anthesia" (Lateef) – 7:03  
 "Scotch and Water" (Joe Zawinul) – 5:56  
 "Cannon's Theme" (Sam Jones) – 3:17  
 Recorded at the Village Vanguard in New York City, NY on January 12 & 14, 1962

Personnel 
 Cannonball Adderley – alto saxophone
 Nat Adderley – cornet
 Yusef Lateef – tenor saxophone, flute (# 2), oboe (# 5)
 Joe Zawinul – piano
 Sam Jones – bass
 Louis Hayes – drums

References 

1962 live albums
Cannonball Adderley live albums
Albums produced by Orrin Keepnews
Riverside Records live albums
Albums recorded at the Village Vanguard